The Maybank HC are the Malaysia Hockey League (MHL) team from Seremban, Negeri Sembilan, Malaysia.

Players

First team

Notable players
   Muhammad Anuar Ali - 2005

Club officials

Coaching and medical staff
 Manager:  Abdul Rahim Musa
 Chief coach:  Wallace Tan

Chief coach history

Honours
 Malaysia Hockey League titles
 Winners (2): 1994, 199
 MHL-TNB Cup/Overall champions
 Winners (1): 1990
 Hockey Asian Champion Clubs Cup title
 Winners (1):  1991
 Runner-up (1): 1995

See also
 Malaysia Hockey League

References

Malaysian field hockey clubs
Maybank